Probles is a genus of ichneumonid wasp of the subfamily Tersilochinae.  It has a widespread distribution.

Species

Probles alejandroi, (Khalaim & Ruiz-Cancino, 2019)
Probles anatolicus, (Horstmann, 1981)
Probles antennalis, (Horstmann, 1981)
Probles belokobylskii, (Khalaim & Ruiz-Cancino, 2019)
Probles brevicauda, (Horstmann, 1981)
Probles brevicornis, (Horstmann, 1981)
Probles brevivalvis, (Horstmann, 1971)
Probles brevivalvus, (Horstmann, 1971)
Probles canariensis, (Horstmann, 1980)
Probles carpathicus, (Khalaim, 2007)
Probles caudiculatus, (Khalaim, 2007)
Probles clavicornis, (Horstmann, 1971)
Probles clypeola, (Khalaim & Ruiz-Cancino, 2019)
Probles contrerasi, (Khalaim & Ruiz-Cancino, 2019)
Probles curvicauda, (Horstmann, 1981)
Probles erythrostromus, (Gravenhorst, 1829)
Probles exilis, (Holmgren, 1860)
Probles extensor, (Aubert, 1971)
Probles flavipes, (Szepligeti, 1899)
Probles fulgida, (Khalaim & Balueva, 2013)
Probles juaniate, (Khalaim & Ruiz-Cancino, 2019)
Probles kasparyator, (Khalaim, 2007)
Probles korusa, (Khalaim & Kim, 2013)
Probles kotenkoi, (Khalaim, 2003)
Probles kunashiricus, (Khalaim, 2003)
Probles longicaudator, (Aubert, 1972)
Probles longisetosus, (Hedwig, 1956)
Probles lucidus, (Szepligeti, 1899)
Probles lunai, (Khalaim & Ruiz-Cancino, 2019)
Probles maturus, (Provancher, 1886)
Probles megasoma, (Khalaim & Ruiz-Cancino, 2019)
Probles miquihana, (Khalaim & Ruiz-Cancino, 2019)
Probles montanus, (Horstmann, 1971)
Probles neoversutus, (Horstmann, 1967)
Probles nigriventris, (Horstmann, 1971)
Probles picus, (Khalaim & Ruiz-Cancino, 2019)
Probles pygmaeus, (Zetterstedt, 1838)
Probles rarus, (Horstmann, 1981)
Probles ruficornis, (Szepligeti, 1899)
Probles rufipes, (Holmgren, 1860)
Probles rukora, (Khalaim & Lee, 2013)
Probles sibiricus, (Khalaim, 2007)
Probles spectabilis, (Khalaim & Ruiz-Cancino, 2019)
Probles temporalis, (Horstmann & Kolarov, 1988)
Probles temulentus, (Khalaim, 2007)
Probles tenuicornis, (Horstmann, 1981)
Probles thomsoni, (Schmiedeknecht, 1911)
Probles truncorum, (Holmgren, 1860)
Probles versutus, (Holmgren, 1860)
Probles vulnificus, (Khalaim & Sheng, 2009)
Probles xalapana, (Khalaim & Ruiz-Cancino, 2019)
Probles zacapoaxtlana, (Khalaim & Ruiz-Cancino, 2019)

References

Ichneumonidae genera
Ichneumonidae